The Europe and Africa Zone is one of the three zones of regional Davis Cup competition in 2012.

In the Europe and Africa Zone there are four different groups in which teams compete against each other to advance to the next group.

Teams

 
  (promoted to Group II)
 
 

 
 
  (promoted to Group II)

Format
The nine teams will be split into two pools. The winner of Pool A plays against the runner-up of Pool B and the winner of Pool B against the runner-up of Pool A. The two winning teams will be promoted.

It will played on the week commencing 2 July 2012 at Tunis, Tunisia and it will be played on outdoor hard court.

Groups

Group A

Tunisia vs. Zimbabwe

Ghana vs. Namibia

Zimbabwe vs. Ghana

Tunisia vs. Namibia

Zimbabwe vs. Namibia

Tunisia vs. Ghana

Group B

Algeria vs. Côte d'Ivoire

Benin vs. Kenya

Algeria vs. Kenya

Benin vs. Côte d'Ivoire

Algeria vs. Benin

Côte d'Ivoire vs. Kenya

Play-offs

1st to 4th play-off

Tunisia vs. Côte d'Ivoire

Benin vs. Zimbabwe

5th to 6th play-off

Namibia vs. Kenya

7th to 8th play-off

Ghana vs. Algeria

References

External links
Draw Results

Africa Zone Group III
Davis Cup Europe/Africa Zone